The 1973–74 Algerian Championnat National was the 12th season of the Algerian Championnat National since its establishment in 1962. A total of 16 teams contested the league, with JS Kawkabi as the defending champions.

Team summaries

Promotion and relegation 
Teams promoted from Algerian Division 2 1973–1974 
 USM Alger
 USM Khenchela
 MC Saïda

Teams relegated to Algerian Division 2 1974–1975
 JSM Tiaret
 ASM Oran
 WA Tlemcen

League table

References

External links
1973–74 Algerian Championnat National

Algerian Ligue Professionnelle 1 seasons
1973–74 in Algerian football
Algeria